Ivan Kolev (born 15 October 1995) is a Bulgarian footballer who currently plays for Spartak Varna as a forward.

Career
In September 2021 Kolev signed with Spartak Varna.

References

External links

1995 births
Living people
Bulgarian footballers
FC Oborishte players
PFC Lokomotiv Plovdiv players
FC Pomorie players
PFC Nesebar players
FC Botev Vratsa players
FC Lokomotiv Gorna Oryahovitsa players
Neftochimic Burgas players
FC Sozopol players
First Professional Football League (Bulgaria) players
Association football forwards